Anjab-e Buzhan (also Romanized as Anjāb-e Būzhān; also known as Anjāb) is a village in Osmanvand Rural District, Firuzabad District, Kermanshah County, Kermanshah Province, Iran. At the 2006 census, its population was 230, in 46 families.

References 

Populated places in Kermanshah County